002, 0O2, O02, OO2, or 002 may refer to:

Airports
0O2, Baker Airport
O02, Nervino Airport

Astronomy
1996 OO2, the minor planet 7499 L'Aquila
1990 OO2, the asteroid 9175 Graun

Fiction
002, fictional British 00 Agent
002 Operazione Luna, a 1965 Italian film
Zero Two, a Darling in the Franxx character

Guantanamo detainee 002
David Hicks (born 1975), Australian who was convicted by the United States Guantanamo military commission
Detainee 002: The Case of David Hicks, a 2007 book by Leigh Sales

Patents
Patents referred to as 'the '002 patent'
US patent 6493002, a patent owned by Apple Inc. involved in a legal case with Samsung
US patent 7454002, a patent owned by SportBrain involved in a legal case with Apple Inc.

Other uses
002, former emergency telephone number for the Norwegian police (until 1986)
BAR 002, 2000 Formula One season car
O02 (allele), an allele of the ABO gene
Oo2, a training center
Type 002, a Chinese aircraft carrier currently under construction.
0–0–2 or zero-zero-two, the starting score for a game of doubles pickleball